Tigava is a genus of lace bugs in the family Tingidae. There are about 15 described species in Tigava.

Species
These 15 species belong to the genus Tigava:

References

Further reading

 
 
 
 
 
 
 
 
 
 
 

Tingidae
Articles created by Qbugbot